Maggie Wu (born Wu Ya-hsin) is a Taiwanese model and actress. Her breakthrough was starring alongside the singer in the music video for Peter Ho's 2008 "I Only Care for You". She has since been a cover girl for GQ Taiwan (in 2009) and for FHM Taiwan (in 2009 and in 2011). She has also acted in other music videos and has appeared in several television roles.

Maggie Wu was one of the victims of socialite serial sex offender Justin Lee.

References

External links
 
 

1983 births
Living people
Taiwanese female models
Taiwanese television actresses